Thomas William Bowyer (13 February 1895 – 1940) was an English footballer who played in the Football League for Clapton Orient, Gillingham, Stoke and Walsall.

Career
Bowyer was born in Stoke-upon-Trent and joined Stoke during World War I. He played three times for Stoke in 1918–19 and once the War was over and League football resumed Bowyer decided to join Clapton Orient. He scored six goals in 22 for Orient in 1919–20 and he joined Gillingham for the 1920–21 season. But he never made an appearances for the "Gills" and went on to play for Walsall in 1921–22, scoring five goals in 40 matches.

Career statistics

References

1895 births
1940 deaths
English footballers
Gillingham F.C. players
Leyton Orient F.C. players
Stoke City F.C. players
Walsall F.C. players
English Football League players
Association football forwards